Chapitre 7 is the seventh studio album by MC Solaar. The album was released worldwide on June 18, 2007. The album was recorded in New York over an eight-month period. The first single, "Da Vinci Claude", was released in March 2007, and the corresponding video in April 2007. In the song, Solaar relates subjects as political lies. MC Solaar stated in an interview that he did not expect his return to the studio. After the partial success of Mach 6, he wanted to take a break and made trips from Island to the United States. While on tour in the United Kingdom, he realized that he wanted to work with musicians and make music that was different from contemporary French rap. Chapitre 7 mixes the musical styles of rock, rap, salsa and pop. In the album, MC Solaar speaks out about global problems such as war in Africa and child soldiers.

Track listing 

 "" – 1:08
 "" – 4:10
 "" – 4:00
 "" – 2:52
 "Da Vinci Claude" – 3:24
 "In God We Trust" – 2:41
 "" – 3:33
 "" – 2:55
 "" – 4:00
 "" – 3:14
 "" – 3:00
 " remix" – 3:54
 "" – 3:31
 "" – 3:23
 "" – 3:02
 "" – 2:01
 "" – 3:30
 "Outro" – 2:07

Personnel 

 Michel Alibo – Basse
 Philippe Bordas – Photography
 Guillaume Eyango – Choeurs
 Eric K-Roz – Choeurs

Certifications

References

External links 
 Chapitre 7 on Amazon.com

2007 albums
MC Solaar albums